The Sierra de Ávila is a mountain range in the centre of the Iberian Peninsula. Its highest point is Cerro de Gorría, at 1708 metres.

See also
 Sistema Central

References

Avila
Geography of the Province of Ávila
Avila